TV Sports: Football is a 1988 video game by Cinemaware for Amiga, Atari ST, Commodore 64, DOS, and TurboGrafx-16.

Gameplay
TV Sports: Football is the first game released for a series of sports games which featured athletic action like on television.

Reception
Wyatt Lee and J. D. Lambright reviewed the game for Computer Gaming World, and stated that "Action game fans who want a difficult game may not like this game as well as a strict arcade game like John Elway's Quarterback, but players who want to capture the atmosphere, flow of play, and fast-moving competition of professional football should love it."

In the November 1989 edition of the British magazine Games International (Issue 10), Ernesto Williams was not familiar with the American sport of football, but was able to learn the game through this videogame. Although he liked most of the game, including the graphics and audio, he did not admire the appearance of sports announcers from time to time, and pointed out that "Mercifully this window dressing can be skipped in most cases, speeding up play considerably." He also noted that the incessant disk swapping slowed the game considerably. He concluded by giving both the game and its graphics above-average ratings of 4 out of 5, saying, "Simple but subtle, American Football is a game that needs time to fully appreciate."

Matt Taylor reviewed the game for Computer Gaming World, and stated that "Despite the scattered flags on the play, as a multi-player game the call on TV Sports Football with this official is: 'The kick is up... It's long enough... It's good!'"

In 1996, Computer Gaming World declared TV Sports: Football the 112th-best computer game ever released.

Other reviews
The One #35
Amiga Computing Vol 1 #9 (Feb 1989) 
Power Play (March 1989)
Computer and Video Games (Feb, 1989)
The One (Jan, 1989)
Amiga Computing (Jan, 1989)
ACE (Advanced Computer Entertainment) (Nov, 1989)
The Games Machine (Mar, 1989)
Zzap! (Mar, 1989)
ACE (Advanced Computer Entertainment) (Mar, 1989)
The Games Machine (Nov, 1989)
ASM (Aktueller Software Markt) (Feb, 1989)
Computer and Video Games (Jun, 1990)
Commodore User (Feb, 1989)
Power Play (1989)
Your Amiga (Jun, 1989)
Amiga User International (Mar, 1989)
ST Format (Nov, 1989)
Antic's Amiga Plus (Nov, 1989)
Tilt (Jul, 1991)
The Video Game Critic (Apr 14, 2009)
Amiga World (Jul, 1989)
Australian Commodore and Amiga Review (Apr, 1989)

References

External links

Review in Compute!
Review in Info

1988 video games
American football video games
Amiga games
Atari ST games
Commodore 64 games
DOS games
Mirrorsoft games
TurboGrafx-16 games
Video games developed in the United States